Doina Liliana Bălan (later Șnep, born 10 December 1963) is a retired Romanian rower. She competed at the 1984, 1988 and 1992 Olympics and five world championships between 1985 and 1991 and won 10 medals, including three gold medals. Her husband Ioan Snep and sister Anișoara Bălan are also Olympic rowers.

References

External links
 
 
 

1963 births
Living people
People from Liteni
Romanian female rowers
Rowers at the 1984 Summer Olympics
Rowers at the 1988 Summer Olympics
Rowers at the 1992 Summer Olympics
Olympic silver medalists for Romania
Olympic bronze medalists for Romania
Olympic medalists in rowing
World Rowing Championships medalists for Romania
Medalists at the 1992 Summer Olympics
Medalists at the 1988 Summer Olympics
Medalists at the 1984 Summer Olympics